Jakub Miszczuk (born 6 August 1990) is a Polish former footballer who played as a goalkeeper.

Career

Miszczuk started his career with Polish fourth tier side Arka Nowa Sól. Before the second half of 2009–10, he signed for Warta Poznań in the Polish second tier. In 2010, Miszczuk signed for Polish top flight club Śląsk Wrocław. Before the second half of 2010–11, he signed for Zagłębie Sosnowiec in the Polish third tier. In 2012, he signed for Polish top flight team Lech Poznań. 

Before the second half of 2012–13, Miszcsuk signed for Arka Gdynia in the Polish second tier, where he made 35 appearances and scored goals. On 28 March 2013, he debuted for Arka Gdynia during a 3–1 win over Kolejarz Stróże. In 2016, Miszczuk signed for Polish top flight outfit Ruch Chorzów.

References

External links

1990 births
I liga players

II liga players
III liga players

Arka Gdynia players

Association football goalkeepers
Jagiellonia Białystok players
Lech Poznań players
Living people
Nielba Wągrowiec players

OKS Stomil Olsztyn players

People from Sokołów County

Polish footballers

Ruch Chorzów players
Śląsk Wrocław players
Warta Poznań players
Zagłębie Sosnowiec players